Risk cybernetics by Finamatrix.com (Author: Lanz Chan, Ph.D.) is a financial risk management technology and blockchain project comprising risk specification and risk control techniques using advanced artificial intelligence and computing technologies with circular-causal volatility-feedback in a genetic algorithm neural network (GANN) framework. More generally, risk cybernetics refers to risk management techniques which combine human and computer capabilities and functions in a circular-causal network/system. The objective of risk cybernetics is to achieve self-learning, self-enhancing and full-automation capabilities so as to reduce accidents, errors, etc. and obtain predictable and sustainable returns which can be applied to any industry including applications in market data, financial time series, cyber security measures, robotics, etc.

References 

Risk management
Cybernetics